Herpelidae are a family of caecilians, sometimes known as the African caecilians.  They are found in Sub-Saharan Africa. Like other caecilians, they superficially resemble worms or snakes. They are the sister group to the newly discovered Chikilidae.

Distribution
Herpelidae occur primarily in Central and East Africa, barely reaching West Africa (southeastern Nigeria), and northern parts of Southern Africa (Malawi, possibly Zambia).

Genera 
There are two genera with ten species in total:
 Boulengerula Tornier, 1896 – Boulenger's caecilians, Usambara bluish-gray caecilians (8 species)
 Herpele Peters, 1880 – Congo caecilians (2 species)

References

 
Amphibian families
Amphibians of Sub-Saharan Africa
Taxa named by Raymond Laurent